Fulvio Melia (born 2 August 1956) is an Italian-American astrophysicist, cosmologist and author. He is professor of physics, astronomy and the applied math program at the University of Arizona and was a scientific editor of The Astrophysical Journal and an associate editor of The Astrophysical Journal Letters. A former Presidential Young Investigator and Sloan Research Fellow, he is the author of six English books (and various foreign translations) and 230 refereed articles on theoretical astrophysics and cosmology.

Career
Melia was born in Gorizia, Italy. He was educated at Melbourne University and Massachusetts Institute of Technology, and held a post-doctoral research position at the University of Chicago, before taking an assistant professorship at Northwestern University in 1987. Moving to the University of Arizona as an associate professor in 1991, he became a full professor in 1993. From 1988 to 1995, he was a Presidential Young Investigator (under President Ronald Reagan), and then an Alfred P. Sloan Research Fellow from 1989 to 1992. He became a fellow of the American Physical Society in 2002. He is also a professorial fellow in the School of Physics, Melbourne University, and a distinguished visiting professor at Purple Mountain Observatory in Nanjing, China.

From 1996 to 2002, he was a scientific editor with the Astrophysical Journal, and has later been an associate editor with The Astrophysical Journal Letters. He is also the chief editor of the Theoretical Astrophysics series of books at the University of Chicago Press.

 In a career that has seen him publish 260 refereed research papers and seven books, Melia has made important contributions in High Energy Astronomy and the physics of supermassive black holes. He is especially known for his work on the Galactic Center, particularly developing a theoretical understanding of the central supermassive black hole, known as Sagittarius A*. With his students and collaborators, he was the first to propose that imaging this object with millimeter-interferometry would reveal the shape and size of the shadow predicted by general relativity, thereby providing empirical evidence for the validity of the Kerr metric. Fulvio Melia's foundational work on this concept, and associated outreach through several books he has written on this topic, have led to the development of the  Event Horizon Telescope, which today is poised to make a mm-wavelength image of this object as predicted almost two decades ago.

Melia and his students have developed the so-called Rh=ct Universe, a cosmological theory that, they argue, has accounted for the observational data better than all other models proposed thus far. In this cosmology, the Universe has no horizon problem, and therefore evolved without inflation.

Melia's cosmology is notable for its simplicity and its adherence to the symmetries implied by the Friedmann-Robertson-Walker metric, which require the comoving frame to be inertial. Its timeline has been confirmed by the discovery of high-redshift quasars, whose billion-solar-mass size is too large to accommodate within the compressed time scale of the standard model. In Rh=ct, these supermassive black holes would instead have easily grown by billions of solar masses via conventional Eddington-limited accretion.

He is a publicist of astronomy and science in general, delivering lectures at public venues, including museums and planetariums. His books have won several awards of distinction, including the designation of Outstanding Academic Books by the American Library Association, and selection as worldwide astronomy books of the year by Astronomy magazine.

In 2014 he presented the Walter Stibbs Lecture at the University of Sydney, the title being "Cracking the Einstein Code".

Books
 Electrodynamics (2001), University of Chicago Press,  (Cloth),  (Paper)
 The Black Hole at the Center of Our Galaxy (2003), Princeton University Press,  (Cloth)
 Il Buco Nero al Centro della Nostra Galassia (2005), Bollati Boringhieri, 
 The Edge of Infinity. Supermassive Black Holes in the Universe (2003), Cambridge University Press,  (Cloth)
 Na Skraju Nieskonczonosci] (2005), Wydawnictwo Amber,  (Cloth)
 The Galactic Supermassive Black Hole (2007), Princeton University Press, 
 High-Energy Astrophysics] (2009), Princeton University Press,  (Paper),  (Cloth)
 Cracking the Einstein Code] (2009), University of Chicago Press, 
 The Cosmic Spacetime] (2020), Taylor & Francis,

References

 Fulvio Melia, (2001). Electrodynamics (Chicago Lectures in Physics), University Of Chicago Press.

External links
 

1956 births
Living people
People from Gorizia
Italian emigrants to the United States
Italian expatriates in Australia
American astrophysicists
Italian astrophysicists
Massachusetts Institute of Technology alumni
University of Chicago faculty
Northwestern University faculty
University of Arizona faculty
Fellows of the American Physical Society